ÇEKÜL is a cultural heritage foundation in Turkey. It is the acronym of  Çevre ve Kültür Değerlerini Koruma ve Tanıtma Vakfı ( “Preservation and Promotion Foundation of the Environment and Culture” ) Its head office is in İstanbul. Presently its speaker is Professor Metin Sözen.

Çekül was founded in 1990 by a group of intellectuals. It is a Non Governmental Organization specialized in consultation of such subjects as  city planning, restoration and maintenance of the houses and traditional market places. It is also a major participant  of the Turkish Historical Cities Association.

References

1990 establishments in Turkey
Cultural organizations based in Turkey
Organizations based in Istanbul
Foundations based in Turkey
Conservation and environmental foundations
Environmental organizations established in 1990